Marvin Egho  (born 9 May 1994) is an Austrian professional footballer who plays as a forward for Danish Superliga club Randers.

Club career
Egho started his career at SV Donau Wien. After playing at FC Stadlau, SC Obersiebenbrunn, SC Wiener Neustadt and FK Austria Wien, he went to SR Donaufeld Wien in 2011. In 2013, he moved to SK Rapid Wien, where he only played for the reserves. In 2014, Egho moved to Austrian Football Bundesliga club FC Admira Wacker Mödling. He made his Bundesliga and professional debut on the first matchday of the 2014–15 season against Wolfsberger AC. In January 2016, he returned to his youth club SC Wiener Neustadt on loan until the end of the season.

For the 2016–17 season he moved to SV Ried, where he signed a three-year contract.

After suffering from the Bundesliga with Ried, Egho moved to Slovakian side Spartak Trnava for the 2017–18 season, where he signed a two-year contract.

In August 2018, Egho moved to Danish Superliga club Randers FC.

International career
Born in Austria, Egho is of Nigerian descent. He made his Austria U21 debut as a substitute for Kevin Friesenbichler after 61 minutes of a 4–0 win over Qatar in a friendly on 28 March 2015.

Honours

Club 
Spartak Trnava
Slovak Super Liga: 2017–18

Randers
Danish Cup: 2020–21

References

1996 births
Living people
Austrian people of Nigerian descent
Footballers from Vienna
Austrian footballers
Austrian expatriate footballers
Austria under-21 international footballers
Austrian Football Bundesliga players
2. Liga (Austria) players
Slovak Super Liga players
Danish Superliga players
FC Admira Wacker Mödling players
SC Wiener Neustadt players
SV Ried players
FC Spartak Trnava players
Randers FC players
Association football forwards
Expatriate footballers in Slovakia
Expatriate men's footballers in Denmark
Austrian expatriate sportspeople in Slovakia
Austrian expatriate sportspeople in Denmark